Azi Schwartz (Hebrew: עזי שוורץ) is a chazzan (cantor), vocal performer, and recording artist. Born in Israel, he lives in New York City, where he serves as the Senior Cantor of Park Avenue Synagogue.

Education 
Before his musical career, Cantor Schwartz attended Yeshivat Har Etzion. He completed his military service as a soloist in the Israeli Defense Forces Rabbinical Troupe. Cantor Schwartz earned his undergraduate degree in Teaching Jewish Philosophy and Jewish Studies from the Herzog College before studying at the Jerusalem Academy of Music and Dance. He received his master's degree in Voice in Conducting from Mannes School of Music at The New School. Cantor Schwartz received his cantorial training at Tel Aviv Cantorial Institute, where he studied under Cantor Neftali Hershtik.

Professional Accomplishments 
Cantor Azi Schwartz has performed at Madison Square Garden, the United Nations, and on Capitol Hill. Cantor Schwartz was featured as a part of a trio on a PBS special titled “Cantors of New York”. Cantor Schwartz performed a prayer for the Pope Francis's visit to Ground Zero in 2015. He has performed at Carnegie Hall, including a duet with tenor Lawrence Brownlee. His videos are popular on Youtube, with over 13 million views. During the 2020 pandemic, he led services for Park Avenue Synagogue livestream online, which attracted thousands of viewers.

Style 
Cantor Azi Schwartz is known for mixing Jewish ritual music with contemporary melodies, with an intent of bringing new life to the tradition of Jewish liturgical music. He often will perform traditional prayers to contemporary melodies, including performing "Adon Olam" to the tune of "You'll be Back" from Hamilton and “For Forever” from Dear Evan Hansen, and Ose Shalom to the tune of “Shallow” by Lady Gaga and Bradly Cooper.

Personal life 
Cantor Azi Schwartz grew up in the Israeli settlement of Alon Shvut in Gush Etzion and studied in the Jerusalem's Netiv Meir Yeshiva. He was inspired to become a cantor through his grandfather, who was a cantor in Hungary. He enjoys riding motorcycles as a hobby. He is married to Dr. Noa Schwartz with four children.

Discography 
 Be The Light
 Siddur for Young Families
 Havdalah: Live from Jerusalem
 Heritage: Treasures of Jewish German Composers
 Moments of Awe: Music of the High Holy Days
 L’dor Vador
 Yihyu L’ratzon
 Mizmor Shir
 Hadesh Yameinu: New Music at Park Avenue Synagogue
 Shir Hadash: New Music at Park Avenue Synagogue
 Ahavat Olam: Jewish Romantic Music
 Ki Eshmerah Shabbat - Volume 1: Shabbat Morning
 Mahzor for Young Families: Rosh Hashanah and Yom Kippur
 Youth Machzor 2018
 Siddur for Youth

References 

Hazzans

Year of birth missing (living people)
Living people
Yeshivat Har Etzion